SML Isuzu Limited (SMLI) is a commercial vehicle manufacturer established in 1983. SMLI produces and sells buses, ambulances and customized vehicles. Sumitomo Corporation and Isuzu Motors hold a 44% and 15% stake of the company respectively.

The company manufactures light commercial vehicles like trucks, buses, school buses, ambulances, police personnel carriers, water tankers and special vehicles. It exports its products to countries like Nepal, Zambia, Bangladesh, Kenya, Tanzania, Ghana, Ivory Coast, Rwanda, Seychelles, Syria, Jordan.

History

The company was incorporated in July 1983 with the name of Swaraj Vehicles Limited. Swaraj Mazda Limited, at Chandigarh, India based automobile company, was owned by the Sumitomo Corporation of Japan and Punjab Tractors Limited of India, with a technical collaboration with Isuzu and Mazda of Japan.

1984
Joint venture and technical assistance agreement concluded between Punjab Tractor Ltd., Mazda Motor Corporation and Sumitomo Corporation. SVL renamed Swaraj Mazda Ltd.

1985
Project set up with a capacity of 5000 light commercial vehicles (LCVs) at capital outlay of Rs. 200 million. Equity of Rs. 105 million was subscribed by:

Trial production and test marketing of Swaraj Mazda truck WT-48, WT-49, WT-50 LCV commence.
The development of the vendor base undertaken as per approved by the government of India.

1986
After some trial production in 1985, series production began in 1986.

1987
Introduction of indigenously developed bus.

1989
In-house tooling for local production of chassis long member.

1990
In-house developed Second Truck Model (Swaraj Mazda Super) launched.

1991
Transmission components indigenized.

1992
Commencement of Truck supplies to MOD. 500 vehicles supplied to Defence.

1993
Third Truck Model (Swaraj Mazda Premium) launched.

1994
Declared a Sick Company under SICA (due to Rupee devaluation of 1991–93).

1995
BIFR approves Rehabilitation Scheme.

1996
4-Wheel Drive Truck developed.

1997
Company ceases to be a Sick Industrial Company on the basis of positive net worth 4 years ahead of BIFR Scheme projections. 

The company's annual turnover for the year 1997 - 1998 exceeded Rs. 151 crores. It has a dealer network of about 128 dealers spread throughout India. Swaraj Engines and Punjab Scooters are its associate companies.

1998
Completely wiped off of accumulated losses.

1999
Bharat Stage-I Emission Norms complied.

2000
Maiden Dividend declared at 10%.Technical Assistance Agreement with Mazda extended up to October 2004.

2001
Cumulative sales crossed 50,000 vehicles. 4 Wheel Drive Ambulance launched in March. Economy Truck 'SARTAJ' launched in August. CNG Bus for NCR Delhi launched in October. Bharat Stage-II Emission Norms complied.

2002
Profit Before Tax for FY 2002 crosses Rs. 100 Million mark. Dividend raised to 25%.

2003
Profit Before Tax for FY-2003 grows 115% to Rs. 225 Million. Dividend enhanced to 45%.

2004
Profit Before Tax for FY-2004 grows 44% to Rs. 324 Million. Dividend enhanced to 70%.

2005
Cumulative sales crossed 86,000 vehicles. Bharat Stage-III emission norms complied (both diesel & CNG). Dividend enhanced to 75%. Punjab Tractors offloads 15% of equity stake in favor of Sumitomo Corporation, Japan in June. Mazda Motor Corporation offloads 15% of equity holding in favor of Sumitomo Corporation, Japan in August.

2006
Permission from Government for new manufacturing facilities at existing site obtained in January.
Dividend rate lowered to 55% due profit and declined the Technical Assistance Agreement with Isuzu Motors signed in June. Aggregate vehicles sale crosses  in August. Construction of Buildings for vehicle expansion and new Bus Body Plant taken up in August.

In June 2006, Swaraj Mazda entered a new Technical agreement with Isuzu Motors, Japan.

2007
Dividend rate maintained at 55%.Trial Production of Isuzu Bus LT134 taken up in July.

2008
Dividend rate maintained at 55%. Highest-ever profit in the history of the company. Launch of Ultra Luxury Buses in July.

2009
Sumitomo upped its stake in the company in 2009 by purchasing all of Punjab Tractors' remaining shares, raising their stake to 53.5%

In 2009, Swaraj Mazda started to roll out Luxury buses and medium-duty trucks powered by Isuzu Engines from a new plant in Punjab. Plans are to build multi-axle trucks, tractor units and refrigerated trucks within the next three years. For an interim period, these vehicles were marketed under the Swaraj Mazda Isuzu brand.

In addition, Swaraj Mazda is moving to offer the Isuzu D-Max pickup.

Former associate company Punjab Tractors manufactured agricultural tractors and combine harvesters under the Swaraj brand name before selling 64.6% to Mahindra Tractors.  In 2009, Mahindra and Swaraj Mazda settled a dispute over the use of the Swaraj name, allowing Swaraj Mazda to continue using the name for only two more years.

2010
During the financial year 2009–10 the company had issued 3,984,946 equity share of Rs. 10 each at a premium of Rs. 190 per share on rights basis to the Equity shareholders of the company in the ratio of 11 equity shares for every 50 Equity shares held on the record date and raised Rs. 796989,000 for financing of Expansion project, repayment of loan taken from Allahabad Bank (for Expansion Project) and for general corporate purposes.

Swaraj Mazda Limited has informed the Exchange that at the Board Meeting of the Company held on 1 October 2010, the Board of Directors have decided to change the name of the company from Swaraj Mazda Limited to SML Isuzu Limited. As of 2011 they no longer use the "Swaraj" brand name.

2011
Swaraj Mazda renamed as SML ISUZU LIMITED.

2012
SML S7 Bus, Wheel Base −5100 mm, 50+1 Seater Launched.

BS-IV Compliant Engine Successfully Tested. (But Buses is not success)

ISUZU FR1318 Luxury Bus, Wheel Base – 5400 mm Launched.

SML HG72 Truck GVW 7200 kg Truck Launched.

SML HD19 Truck GVW 10250 kg Truck Launched.

Vehicles

Trucks

SML
 5252 XM
 Sartaj 59 XM
Sartaj HG72
Prestige
Supreme
Super
Samrat
Samrat HD19
Samrat 1312

Buses

SML
Ecomax AC Cab
Executive LX Bus
Executive Bus
Standard School Bus
S7 School Bus
Semi low Floor Bus
Standard Staff Bus
S7 Staff Bus
Bus Chassis

Isuzu
NQR
FR1318
LT134
IS12TE Chassis
NQR Bus Chassis
LT134 Bus Chassis

References

External links
 SML Isuzu website

Truck manufacturers of India
Ambulances
Bus manufacturers of India
Indian companies established in 2011
Vehicle manufacturing companies established in 2011
Joint ventures
Isuzu
Mazda
1983 establishments in Chandigarh
Companies based in Chandigarh
Indian companies established in 1983